Atiak Sugar Factory Limited (ASFL), also Atiak Sugar Factory, or Atiak Sugar Limited, is a sugar manufacturing company in Uganda.

Location
The headquarters of the company and the main factory of the company are located in Gem Village, Pachilo Parish, Atiak sub-county, Kilak County, in Amuru District, in the Northern Region of Uganda. The geographical coordinates of Atiak Sugar Factory are: 
3°25'05.0"N, 32°07'52.0"E (Latitude:3.418056; Longitude:32.131111).

Overview
The new sugar factory, has a capacity to crush  of raw cane daily, producing  of powder sugar annually. Commissioning of the factory was expected in May 2016, with first distribution of sugar planned for June 2017. The factory will employ over 1,500 people and has contracted with over 5,000 out-growers. The owners of the company have established a working relationship with Gulu Women Entrepreneurs Association Limited (GWEAL), whose objective is to develop Northern Uganda.

In July 2017, the government of Uganda extended a credit facility of US$17.4 million (approx. USh62.65 billion) to Horyal Investments Holding Company Limited, the owner of Atiak Sugar Factory. The loan, according to Uganda's finance minister will help Horyal to finish construction, procure the sugar-manufacturing machinery and start sugar production. Amina Hersi Moghe, the Chief Executive Officer of Horyal, says the credit will "provide support to sugarcane out growers, offset the balance of procuring machines and restructure their loan period with DFCU Bank". A new commissioning date has been pushed to June 2019.

Construction
The supervising engineering company is Sugarnpower Projects Private Limited, from India.

As of July 2018, construction was estimated at 70 percent completed. At that time, Amina Morghe Hersi, had invested an estimated USh272 billion (US$70 million) and UDC had invested USh65 billion (US$17 million). In October 2019, the Daily Monitor newspaper reported that completion was slated for the first quarter of 2020. In March 2020, Dr. Amina Moghe Hersi indicated that commissioning of the factory was slated for April 2020.

In July 2020, The Independent (Uganda) newspaper reported that commercial production would start in August 2020.

Ownership
The company is a subsidiary of Horyal Investment Holding Company Limited, owned by Amina Moghe Hersi, a female Kenyan entrepreneur of Somali descent. In May 2018, the government of Uganda, through the Uganda Development Corporation (UDC), took a 10.1 percent ownership in Atiak Sugar Factory, for an investment of USh20 billion (approximately US$5.5 million).

In July 2018, UDC invested another USh45 billion (approx. US$11.6 million), thus raising its stake in the factory to 32 percent. In April 2019, the company requested another USh 24 billion (approx. US$6.5 million), in funding to complete construction of offices and staff houses, with opening planned for the second half of 2019. This would bring the governments shareholding to 44 percent.

Co-generation
When the factory opens, it is expected to have crushing capacity of 1,650 metric tonnes of sugarcane daily with co-generation of 6 megawatts of electricity. Future production is expected to increase to 3,500 metric tonnes of sugarcane daily with co-generation of 27 megawatts.

See also
 Economy of Uganda
 List of sugar manufacturers in Uganda

References

External links
Stop setting fire on Atiak sugarcane - Acholi chief As of 18 February 2020.
Pictorial: Development of Sugar Factory In Amuru As at 23 July 2017
Uganda: How Uganda Overtook Kenya in Sugar Cane Production
Atiak Sugar Factory Bailout Not In Government’s Best Interests As 7 August 2017.

Food and drink companies established in 2016
2016 establishments in Uganda
Amuru District
Northern Region, Uganda
Sugar companies of Uganda
Agriculture in Uganda
Office buildings completed in 2020